Park Chang-sun (born 2 February 1954) is a South Korean former international footballer.

Playing career 
Park played for six clubs in South Korea and won domestic leagues with five teams. He played roles as the captain and the playmaker for South Korea at the 1986 FIFA World Cup, and scored the first South Korean goal of the FIFA World Cup against Argentina. He was selected as one of the FIFA World Stars after the World Cup, and played in the charity match. Lastly, he participated in the 1986 Asian Games and contributed to South Korea's gold medal.

Style of play 
Park is regarded as one of the greatest South Korean attacking midfielders of all time. He was originally noted for his powerful long-range shots, but he was also skilled in creating chances during his prime.

Career statistics

International

Results list South Korea's goal tally first.

Honours

Player 
POSCO FC
Korean Semi-professional League: 1982
Korean Semi-professional League (Autumn): 1981
Korean National Championship runner-up: 1977

ROK Army
Korean Semi-professional League (Spring): 1980
Korean National Championship: 1979
Korean President's Cup runner-up: 1980

Hallelujah FC
K League 1: 1983

Daewoo Royals
K League 1: 1984
Korean League Cup runner-up: 1986
Asian Club Championship: 1985–86

South Korea B
FISU World University Championships: 1976

South Korea
Asian Games: 1986

Individual
Korean Semi-professional League (Spring) Best Player: 1980
Korean Semi-professional League (Autumn) top goalscorer: 1981
Korean Semi-professional League Best Player: 1982
K League 1 top assist provider: 1983
K League 1 Best XI: 1983, 1984
K League 1 Most Valuable Player: 1984
Korean FA Best XI: 1984, 1985, 1986
World XI: 1986

Manager 
Kyung Hee University
Korean President's Cup: 2001

South Korea U20
AFC Youth Championship: 1998

References

External links
 
 Park Chang-sun – National Team Stats at KFA 
 
 

1954 births
Living people
South Korean footballers
South Korea international footballers
Association football midfielders
Pohang Steelers players
Hallelujah FC players
Busan IPark players
Jeju United FC players
K League 1 players
K League 1 Most Valuable Player Award winners
1986 FIFA World Cup players
Kyung Hee University alumni
Asian Games medalists in football
Footballers at the 1986 Asian Games
Asian Games gold medalists for South Korea
Medalists at the 1986 Asian Games
People from Gimhae